The Carriacou Formation is a geologic formation in Grenada. It preserves fossils dating back to the Early Miocene period.

See also 
 List of fossiliferous stratigraphic units in Grenada

References

Further reading 
 P. Jung. 1971. Fossil mollusks from Carriacou, West Indies. Bulletins of American Paleontology 61(269):1-262

Geologic formations of the Caribbean
Geology of Grenada
Neogene Caribbean
Limestone formations
Shallow marine deposits